Yan Silu, courtesy name Kong Gui, was a Chinese minister of the Sui dynasty and the Tang dynasty. He was a native of Linyi, Langya Commandery.

Background 
Yan Silu is the son of Yan Zhitui. He is a native of Linyi, Langya Commandery (琅琊郡). Yan wrote the preface to his father's anthology. He was born in Jiangling and moved to Dunhuafang, Chang'an, Jingzhao in the early Sui Dynasty. Yan was the elder brother of Yan Minchu and Yan Youqin.

Skilled in producing compositions, Yan was particularly good at exegesis and was a scholar of Confucianism. The historian of education  praised Yan for being "erudite and good at writing". On the topic of scripture meanings, Yan engaged  in a debate. In the Sui dynasty, he served as a secretary for the Department of Economics and was a scholar of the Eastern Palace. Yan also served as attendant to the prince , the son of Yang Yong. Yan was chosen to be an assistant during the reign of Emperor Taizong of Tang and later received a general title.

Yan married the daughter of the doctor Yin Yingtong. The book "Yin Yingtong Collection" (殷英童集) refers to a "Yan son-in-law", which is him.  Over 20 of Yan's songs and poems are included in the collection.

References 

Sui dynasty writers
Tang dynasty writers